The 1963 Swedish speedway season was the 1963 season of motorcycle speedway in Sweden.

Individual

Individual Championship
The 1963 Swedish Individual Speedway Championship final was held on 4 October in Stockholm. Björn Knutsson won the Swedish Championship for the second time.

Swedish Junior Championship
 
Winner - Bengt Ederlöv

Team

Team Championship
Getingarna won division 1 and were declared the winners of the Swedish Speedway Team Championship for the second time. The Getingarna team contained Göte Nordin and Bengt Jansson.

With 18 teams declaring their intention to compete for the 1962 season it was decided to form four divisions.

Örnarna won the secon division, while Filbyterna and Dackarna B won the third division north and south respectively.

See also 
 Speedway in Sweden

References

Speedway leagues
Professional sports leagues in Sweden
Swedish
Seasons in Swedish speedway